The Ministry of Economy (Misrad HaKalkala) is a ministry of the Israeli government that oversees commerce, industry and labor in Israel.

History
The ministry was established in 1948 as the Ministry of Commerce and Industry. In 1977 the Tourism Ministry post was added to it, becoming the Ministry of Industry, Trade, and Tourism. However, the merger was reversed in 1981 and the office was renamed Ministry of Industry and Trade. Labor, which had been merged with the Welfare Ministry in the 1970s, was appended to the portfolio in 2003.

List of ministers

Deputy ministers

References

External links
Ministry website
All Ministers in the Ministry of Trade and Industry Knesset website

Economy
Ministry of Economy
Economy
Economy of Israel
Israel
Ministries established in 1948
1948 establishments in Israel